is a Japanese voice actress from Tokyo. She sang the ending theme to the anime Tokimeki Memorial Only Love, "Kiseki no Kakera", (奇跡のかけら) along with Yuki Makishima and Yukako Yoshikawa as well as the opening songs for Working!! – Someone Else, Coolish Walk, Now!!!Gamble with Kana Asumi and Eri Kitamura. She is best known for voicing Akagi in Kantai Collection, Ayano Sugiura in YuruYuri and Yukari Kotozume/Cure Macaron in Kirakira PreCure a la Mode, as well as for sampling her voice for Crypton Future Media's Vocaloid, Hatsune Miku.

Filmography

Anime television series

2005
 Akahori Gedou Hour Rabuge (Maid)
 Happy Seven ~The TV Manga~ (Tomomi Sasaki)
 Shuffle! – (A schoolgirl)
 SPEED GRAPHER (Kozue Kokubunji)

2006
 Tokimeki Memorial Only Love (Mina Yayoi)
 Tsuyokiss Cool×Sweet (Kinu Kanisawa)
 Yoshinaga-san Chi no Gargoyle (Momo Katagiri, Rimu)(*)

2007
 Gakuen Utopia Manabi Straight! (Momoha Odori)

2008
 Akiba-chan (Milk-chan)
 Kamen no Maid Guy (Elizabeth K. Strawberryfield)
 Zoku Sayonara Zetsubō Sensei (ep 13) (Hatsune Miku)
 Yozakura Quartet (Ao Nanami)

2009
 Chrome Shelled Regios (Munfa Rufa)
 Heaven's Lost Property (Tomoko)

2010
 Angel Beats! (Hitomi)
 Durarara!! (Ruri Hijiribe)
 Heaven's Lost Property: Forte (Tomoko)
 Night Raid 1931 (Fuu Lan)
 Ōkami Kakushi (Kuzumi Mana)
 Working!! (Mahiru Inami)
 The Legend of the Legendary Heroes (Milk Kallaud)

2011
 Jewelpet Sunshine (DonaDona)
 SKET Dance (Chika, Chuutarou Oozora, Haruko, Mariko Satonaka, Yamako Hanada)
 Working'!! (Mahiru Inami)
 YuruYuri (Ayano Sugiura)

2012
 Battle Spirits: Heroes (Kimari Tatsumi)
 Chōsoku Henkei Gyrozetter (Haruka)
 Jewelpet Kira☆Deco! (DonaDona)
 Sankarea: Undying Love (Natsukawa)
 YuruYuri♪♪ (Ayano Sugiura)

2013
 A Town Where You Live (Rin Eba)
 Arpeggio of Blue Steel -Ars Nova- (Hyūga)
 Attack on Titan (Ymir)
 Devils and Realist (Jeanne d'Arc)
 Koroshiya-san: The Hired Gun (Chichi no Kataki Onna)
 Muromi-san (Otohime)
 Pocket Monsters: Best Wishes! Season 2: Episode N (Verbena)
 Yozakura Quartet: Hana no Uta (Ao Nanami)

2014
 Dragon Collection (Pennetta)
 Engaged to the Unidentified (Konoha Suetsugi)
 Girl Friend Beta (Tomo Oshii)
 Gundam Build Fighters Try (Shia Kijima)
 Log Horizon 2 (Lasphere)
 Magical Warfare (Hotaru Kumagai)
 Sakura Trick (Mitsuki Sonoda)
 Sword Art Online II (Skuld)

2015
 Assassination Classroom (Ritsu)
 Attack on Titan: Junior High (Ymir)
 Durarara!!x2 (Ruri Hijiribe)
 Go! Princess PreCure (Chieri)
 Kantai Collection (Akagi)
 Rampo Kitan: Game of Laplace (Minami)
 Wish Upon the Pleiades (Nanako)
 Working!! (Mahiru Inami)
 YuruYuri Nachuyachumi! + (Ayano Sugiura)
 YuruYuri San Hai! (Ayano Sugiura)

2016
 Brave Witches (Fumika Kitagou)
 Danganronpa 3: The End of Kibōgamine Gakuen (Seiko Kimura)
 Haven't You Heard? I'm Sakamoto (Tanaka)
 New Game! (Yamada)

2017
 Attack on Titan Season 2 (Ymir)
 Armed Girl's Machiavellism (Kyoubou, Doumou and Eva Maria Rose)
 King's Game The Animation (Aya Kuramoto)
 Kirakira PreCure a la Mode (Yukari Kotozume/Cure Macaron)
 New Game!! (Yamada)
 Seiren (Yukie Takato)

2018
 Conception (Femiruna)
 Cardcaptor Sakura: Clear Card (Rika Sasaki, as a replacement for Tomoko Kawakami)
 Shinkansen Henkei Robo Shinkalion (Hatsune Miku)
 Hugtto! PreCure (Yukari Kotozume/Cure Macaron)

2019
 Boruto: Naruto Next Generations (Remon Yoimura)

2021
 Yashahime: Princess Half-Demon - The Second Act (Rion)

2022
 Birdie Wing: Golf Girls' Story (Ichina Saotome)
 Kantai Collection: Let's Meet at Sea (Akagi)
 Dropkick on My Devil! X (Hatsune Miku)

Animated films
 Jewelpet the Movie: Sweets Dance Princess (2012) (Coron, DonaDona)
 KanColle: The Movie (2016) (Akagi, Tokitsukaze) 
 Pretty Cure Dream Stars! (2017) (Yukari Kotozume/Cure Macaron)
 Kirakira PreCure a la Mode the Movie: Crisply! The Memory of Mille-feuille! (2017) (Yukari Kotozume/Cure Macaron)
 Pretty Cure Super Stars! (2018) (Yukari Kotozume/Cure Macaron)
 Violence Voyager (2019) (Yoshiko)

Original video animation (OVA)
 Hiyokoi (2010) (Ritsuka Nakano)
 Mayo Elle Otoko no Ko (2010) (Tamazusa Shirogane)
 Baby Princess 3D Paradise 0 Love (2011) (Tsurara Amatsuka)
 Ai Mai! Moe Can Change! (2012) (Ai Server, Mi Server)
 Namiuchigiwa no Muromi-san: Pangea Chou Tairiku no Muromi-san (2013) (Otohime)
 YuruYuri Nachuyachumi! (2014) (Ayano Sugiura)
 Armed Girl's Machiavellism (2017) (Kyoubou)
 Yuru Yuri, (2019) (Ayano Sugiura)

Original net animation (ONA)
 Wish Upon the Pleiades (2011) (Nanako)
 Cyclops Shōjo Saipu (2013) (Rin Fujisaki)
 Koro-sensei Quest! (2016) (Ritsu)
 MiniYuri (2019) (Ayano Sugiura)

Video games
2006
 Tokimeki Memorial Online (Mina Yayoi/ PC online game)
2007
 Gakuen Utopia Manabi Straight! Kira Kira☆Happy Festa! (Momoha Odori/ PS2 game)
2009
 Agarest Senki Zero (Alice)
 Hatsune Miku: Project DIVA (Hatsune Miku)
2010
 Agarest Senki Zero: Dawn of War (Alice)
 Hatsune Miku: Project DIVA Arcade (Hatsune Miku)
 Hatsune Miku: Project DIVA 2nd (Hatsune Miku)
2011
 Rune Factory Oceans (Quinn)
 Nora to Toki no Kōbō: Kiri no Mori no Majo (Mellow)
 Hatsune Miku: Project DIVA Extend (Hatsune Miku)
2012
 Tales of Innocence (QQ Selesneva)
 Street Fighter X Tekken (Elena)
 Hatsune Miku and Future Stars: Project Mirai (Hatsune Miku)
 Miku Flick (Hatsune Miku)
 Miku Flick/02 (Hatsune Miku)
 Hatsune Miku: Project DIVA F (Hatsune Miku)
2013
 Super Robot Wars UX (Fei-Yen HD, Hatsune Miku)
 Kantai Collection (8 different ships, see list)
 Hatsune Miku: Project Mirai 2 (Hatsune Miku)
2014
 Ultra Street Fighter IV (Elena)
 Hatsune Miku: Project DIVA F 2nd (Hatsune Miku)
2015
 BlazBlue Chrono Phantasma Extend (Cajun Faycott)
2016
 Digimon World: Next Order (Shiki)
 Hatsune Miku: Project DIVA X (Hatsune Miku)
2018
 Grand Chase: Dimensional Chaser (Lydia Norwood, Dark Nephilim)
2019
 Destiny Child Global (Hatsune Miku, Snow Miku, Princess Snow Miku)
 Arknights (Yato)
 Lilycle Rainbow Stage!!! (Seira Hitsuji)
 Variable Barricade (Hibari Tojo)
2020
 Hatsune Miku: Project DIVA Mega Mix (Hatsune Miku)
2021
 Gate of Nightmares (Abigail)

2022 

 Blue Archive (Hatsune Miku)

 Bleach: Brave Souls (Picaro, Urozakuro)

Drama CD
 Strobe Edge (2008) (Noriko)
 The Demon Prince of Momochi House (2014) (Himari Momochi)
 The Demon Prince of Momochi House Part 2 (2015) (Himari Momochi)
 The Demon Prince of Momochi House Part 3 (2015) (Himari Momochi)

See also
 Nyan Cat

References

External links
 
 
 

1984 births
Living people
Voice actresses from Tokyo Metropolis
Vocaloid voice providers
Japanese video game actresses
Japanese voice actresses
21st-century Japanese actresses
Arts Vision voice actors